Roy Black (born February 17, 1945) is an American civil and criminal defense trial attorney. He is known for his gaining an acquittal, in 1991, of William Kennedy Smith on charges of rape and for his representation of conservative radio commentator Rush Limbaugh. Other celebrities whom Black has represented include actor Kelsey Grammer, racer Hélio Castroneves,  Girls Gone Wild creator Joe Francis, artist Peter Max, financier Jeffrey Epstein, and pop musician Justin Bieber. Black is also informally referred to by his nickname, "The Professor."

Early life and education
Black was born in New York City in 1945. His parents divorced soon after his birth and his mother remarried in 1951 to a British automotive executive who moved the family to Connecticut and then to Jamaica. Black attended Jamaica College and then earned an undergraduate degree at the University of Miami in 1967 and a Juris Doctor at the University of Miami School of Law. While attending UM, Black was a member of the Zeta Epsilon chapter of Alpha Tau Omega.  Following his 1970 graduation, he received the highest possible score on the Florida Bar Exam. After school, he worked as an assistant public defender. In 1973, he worked as an adjunct professor in criminal evidence at the University of Miami.

Career
Currently a partner in Black Srebnick, a Miami-based trial firm specializing in civil litigation and criminal defense, Black also serves as an adjunct instructor of criminal evidence at the University of Miami School of Law. In 2022, Black won an acquittal for a client charged with bribing a Georgetown University tennis coach to admit his daughter to Georgetown, ending the U.S. Government's unbroken streak of convictions in the "Varsity Blues" prosecutions.  In addition to his legal work, Black provides legal commentary for various NBC news shows and played the "managing partner" of The Law Firm, a short-lived reality-based TV show pitting lawyers against each other week-to-week in a legal version of The Apprentice.

Personal life
Black has been married three times. In 1984, he married his second wife, Naomi Morris Black, with whom he has a daughter, Nora Black (psychotherapist, San Francisco). In 1994, Roy Black married Lea Black, who was a juror in the William Kennedy Smith trial and was a castmate on The Real Housewives of Miami. They began dating several months after the trial. They have a son, RJ, who like his father, occasionally appears on the show (e.g., in episode 2.7, "Bras and Brawls, Part I", in which the three discuss one of Black's cases).

References

External links
 Roy Black Official Web Site

1945 births
Living people
American legal scholars
Television personalities from New York City
Criminal defense lawyers
Florida lawyers
Lawyers from New York City
University of Miami alumni
University of Miami School of Law alumni